Bilal Ganj or  Bilal Gunj  is an automobiles market in Lahore, Punjab, Pakistan. 

Bilal Ganj market is situated close to the shrine of the Sufi saint Data Ganj Baksh (Ali  Hujwiri).

References

Bazaars in Lahore